ANGLE (Almost Native Graphics Layer Engine) is an open source, cross-platform graphics engine abstraction layer developed by Google. ANGLE translates OpenGL ES 2/3 calls to DirectX 9, 11, OpenGL or Vulkan API calls.  It's a portable version of OpenGL but with limitations of OpenGL ES standard. 

The API is mainly designed to bring up a high-performance OpenGL compatibility to MS Windows and to web browsers such as Chromium by translating OpenGL calls to Direct3D, which has much better driver support on Windows systems. On Windows, there are two backend renderers for ANGLE: the oldest one uses Direct3D 9.0c, while the newer one uses Direct3D 11.

ANGLE is currently used by Google Chrome (it's embedded into the Blink browser engine), Firefox, Edge, WebKit, and the Qt Framework. The engine is also used by Windows 10 for compatibility with apps ported from Android. Throughout 2019, the Apple team contributed a Metal API backend for the ANGLE so Apple devices could run on their native graphics APIs.

ANGLE is distributed under a BSD-license.

History 
The project started as a way for Google to bring full hardware acceleration for WebGL to Windows without relying on OpenGL graphics drivers. Google initially released the program under the BSD license.

The current production version (2.1.x) implements OpenGL ES 2.0, 3.0,
3.1 and EGL 1.5, claiming to pass the conformance tests for both. Work was started on then future OpenGL ES 3.0 version, for the newer Direct3D 11 backend.

The capability to use ANGLE in a Windows Store app was added in 2014. Microsoft contributed support for lower feature levels to the project. Supporting CoreWindow and SwapChainPanel in ANGLE's EGL allows applications to run on Windows 8.1, Windows Phone 8.1, and later.

Level of OpenGL ES support via backing renderers

Software utilizing ANGLE 
ANGLE is currently used in a number of programs and software.
 Chromium and Google Chrome.  Chrome uses ANGLE not only for WebGL, but also for its implementation of the 2D HTML5 canvas and for the graphics layer of the Google Native Client (which is OpenGL ES 2.0 compatible). 
 Safari web browser uses ANGLE as basis for its WebGL implementation.
 Firefox uses ANGLE as the default WebGL backend on Windows.
 Qt 5 uses ANGLE as the default renderer for its OpenGL ES 2.0 API wrapper and other Qt elements which use it on Windows.
 Candy Crush Saga uses ANGLE as the default renderer in its Windows Store version of the application.
 Cocos2d uses ANGLE as its rendering engine for applications published to the Windows Store.
 ANGLE for Windows Store provides Windows developers precompiled ANGLE binaries via a NuGet package.
 Stellarium provides two versions for Windows: the default version uses OpenGL, the alternative version uses ANGLE as the renderer.
 Shovel Knight uses ANGLE as rendering engine, as seen in final credits.
 RuneScape NXT client uses ANGLE to provide a DirectX 9 compatibility mode for older graphics cards.
 Krita started using ANGLE as the rendering engine on Windows starting on version 3.3.0.
 Microsoft Edge has ANGLE as a rendering option in the "Standards Preview" page in Windows Insider build 17025.
 Grand Theft Auto V included ANGLE in the installation, normally at Systemdrive.
 OpenRA uses ANGLE for rendering on Windows
 SolveSpace uses ANGLE on Windows.
 GameMaker: Studio uses ANGLE at compile-time to convert GLSL ES shaders to HLSL9 for the old Windows 32-bit export module.

References

External links 

 

Application programming interfaces
C++ libraries
Cross-platform software
Free 3D graphics software
Free software programmed in C++
Graphics libraries
Software using the BSD license